Eilef A. Meland  (born 12 April 1947) is a Norwegian economist, university lecturer and politician.

He was born in Haugesund to Johannes Meland and Magnhild Eeg-Olsen. He was elected representative to the Storting for the period 1989–1993 for the Socialist Left Party, and reelected for the period 1993–1997.

References

1947 births
Living people
People from Haugesund
Socialist Left Party (Norway) politicians
Members of the Storting
Academic staff of the University of Stavanger